The following is a list of managers of Bulgarian side Litex Lovech.

Managerial history

Key
* Served as caretaker manager.

As of 31 May 2013.

References

Lists of association football managers
Managers